Rationale is the self-titled debut studio album by Zimbabwe-born British singer-songwriter Rationale. It was released on 13 October 2017 through Warner Music UK.

Track listing

Charts

References

2017 debut albums
Warner Music Group albums